This list of museums in Alberta, Canada contains museums which are defined for this context as institutions (including nonprofit organizations, government entities, and private businesses) that collect and care for objects of cultural, artistic, scientific, or historical interest and make their collections or related exhibits available for public viewing. Also included are non-profit art galleries and university art galleries.  Museums that exist only in cyberspace (i.e., virtual museums) are not included.

Museums

See also
Nature centres in Alberta

References

External link
 Alberta Museums Association

 
Alberta
Museums